Hamburg-Altona (or simply Altona) is a railway station in Hamburg, Germany, situated to the west of the city's main station, in the district which bears its name.

A main line terminal station,  most Intercity-Express (ICE) services to and from southern Germany begin and terminate at Hamburg-Altona. It also has an underground station (named Altona) which is served by the rapid transit trains of the Hamburg S-Bahn. The station is managed by DB Station&Service.

History 
The original Altona station was built by the Altona-Kiel Railway Company at the end of the line from Kiel, some 300 metres south of the current station. It opened in 1844, at which time Altona was an independent city within the Duchy of Holstein (the old station is currently used as the present-day Altona borough's town hall).

In 1866 the link line was opened, allowing trains to run through to Klosterthor station (near the main train station) and on to Berlin or Hanover. In 1867 the Altona-Blankenese railway was opened to the towns on the right bank of the river Elbe (this line is today used by S-Bahn lines S1 and S11).

In 1898 Altona Hauptbahnhof (Altona main station) was opened at the current location. It was badly damaged during World War II but subsequently rebuilt. The building was finally demolished in the late 1970s during the construction of the City-S-Bahn despite protests; it was feared that the tunnelling would cause the structure to collapse. It was replaced by the current two-storey, low-rise precast concrete structure upon its opening in 1979.

Future
In September 2009 the Hamburger Morgenpost and Die Welt revealed that Deutsche Bahn AG plans to close the long distance train station at Altona and to build a new station in the area of Diebsteich station. According to Die Welt, the city government had preliminary studies for the area to build flats and a park. Initially it was expected that the new station would open in 2016. As a result of frequent protests, that date has been delayed until 2027.

Station layout 
Regional and long-distance trains start and terminate at the street-level bay platforms within the terminal. There are two underground island platforms for the Hamburg S-Bahn rapid transit trains, accessible by stairs, escalators and lifts. In front of the station there is a bus station with connections across the city.

Station services

Trains

Long distance 
Altona is the terminus/starting point for ICE lines 18, 25 and 28 to Munich, line 22 to Stuttgart, line 26 to Karlsruhe and line 20 to Basel. All ICE services are run by Deutsche Bahn.

Regional trains 
Regional services available from Altona include number RE 6/60 to Westerland (Sylt) and RB 71 to Itzehoe and Wrist.

S-Bahn (Rapid transit) 
The S1 and S11 line trains on the Blankenese line from the west of the city call at Altona and continue on towards Hamburg Hauptbahnhof via the City S-Bahn and the link line towards Hamburg Airport and the northern terminus at Poppenbüttel. Route S3 runs from Pinneberg in the north-west of the city via the Pinneberg line and continues via Jungfernstieg station and the Hauptbahnhof and via the Harburg S-Bahn towards Neugraben, eventually terminating at Stade in Lower Saxony. Route S31 starts here and runs via the link line, Holstenstrasse station and the Hauptbahnhof towards Harburg and Neugraben.

Facilities 
Several shops are located in the station building, along with emergency and information telephones, ticket machines, toilets, lockboxes and personnel.

Gallery

See also 
 Hamburger Verkehrsverbund
 List of Hamburg S-Bahn stations

References

External links

DB station information 
Picture of the Hamburg-Altona station 
Network plan HVV (PDF, 560 KiB) 

Hamburg S-Bahn stations
Railway stations in Germany opened in 1844
Altona
Buildings and structures in Altona, Hamburg
Hermann Eggert buildings